Skylark was a Canadian pop and rock band active from 1971 to 1973 and based in Vancouver. "Wildflower" is their biggest hit.

History

Skylark formed in 1971 from one of Ronnie Hawkins's backup groups and signed with Capitol Records, releasing a self-titled album in 1972 which spawned three singles. The group, whose alumni include composer/arranger David Foster, disbanded after the lukewarm reception of their second album, Two of its other members, Donny Gerard and Carl Graves achieved mixed success in other projects.

Their biggest single, "Wildflower", was a 1972 number #1 hit in Canada on the RPM Adult Contemporary chart; it reached number 10 on the Canadian RPM singles chart and then peaked at number 9 on the Billboard Hot 100 the following spring, selling over a million copies. It was written by guitarist Doug Edwards and Dave Richardson, who was a Victoria police officer at the time. The song's popularity was boosted by frequent play on CKLW-AM radio after its initial release.

Donny Gerrard was amongst the Canadian musicians who recorded the 1985 charity single for African famine relief entitled "Tears Are Not Enough". He sang his solo line with Bryan Adams.

Doug Edwards died on November 11, 2016. Donny Gerrard died from cancer in February 2022, at the age of 75.

Former members
 B.J. Cook, Donny Gerrard, & Flip Arellano - vocals
 David Foster - keyboards
 Carl Graves - percussion
 Robbie King - Hammond organ
 Eddie Patterson, Doug Edwards, & Gaye Delorme - guitars
 Steven Pugsley - bass
 Duris Maxwell - drums
 Brian Hilton - drums (replaced Maxwell)
 Kat Hendrikse - drums (replaced Hilton)
 Norman McPherson - guitar (replaced Edwards)
 John Verner - guitar (replaced McPherson in 1972)
 Allan Mix - guitar (replaced Verner in 1973)

Discography

Charted singles

Albums

1972 - Skylark (Shanachie/Capitol)
(number 53 in Canada)

Track listing
Side 1
 "Brother Eddie" – (Howie Vickers, Joe Fahrni, Robbie King) - 4:31
 "What Would I Do Without You" - (Ernie Shelby, Phillip Mitchell) - 3:29
 "A Long Way to Go" - (Barry Mann, Cynthia Weil) - 3:46
 "Suites for My Lady" - (David Foster, Duris Maxwell) - 2:06
 "I'll Have to Go Away" - (Kerry Chater, Renée Armand) - 5:07
Side 2
 "The Writing's on the Wall" - (Don Troiano) - 3:01
 "Twenty-Six Years" - (David Foster, Donny Gerrard, Linda Patterson) - 4:55
 "I'm in Love Again" - (Fats Domino, Dave Bartholomew) - 3:18
 "Wildflower" - (David Richardson, Doug Edwards) - 4:08
 "Shall I Fail" - (Carolyn Borsman, Doug Edwards) - 1:27

Personnel
 Donny Gerrard - lead and backing vocals
 B. J. Cook - lead and backing vocals, percussion
 Kitty Ditto - backing vocals
 Patrice Holloway - backing vocals
 Doug Edwards - electric and acoustic guitars
 David Foster - acoustic and electric pianos, harpsichord, Moog synthesizer, string arrangements (all but 3)
 Steve Pugsley - bass
 Duris Maxwell - drums, percussion
 Bobby Torres - congas
 Jimmie Haskell - string arrangements (3)
 Robbie King - organ (8), arrangements (8)

1974 - 2 (Capitol)
 "You Remind Me of a Friend" (B.Russell - B.Gordon) 3:20
 "Love's a River Flowing" (R.Nichols - J.Bettis) 3:58
 "It's a Wonder" (Alexandra Wangberg) 3:14 
 "Wingless Bird" (D.Edwards - C.Borsman) 5:07
 "Wildflower" (D.Richardson - D.Edwards) 4:08
 "If That's The Way You Want It" (D.Lambert - B.Potter) 3:38
 "Foster Frees" (David Foster) 6:19
 "The Love Affair Is Over" (Bob Ruzicka) 3:15
 "One More Mountain to Climb" (N.Sedaka - H.Greenfield) 5:04

Personnel
Produced and Engineered by Erik The Norwegian.
Arrangements and Production Coordination by David Foster

Members of Skylark:
Donny Gerrard - lead vocals, backing vocal arrangements
B.J. Cook Foster - lead and backing vocals
David Foster - piano, electric piano, Moog and pipe organ

Other musicians:
Steve Pugsley - bass
Alan Mix - guitar
Brian Hilton, Duris Maxwell - drums
Carl Graves - backing vocals, percussion
Gabriel Delorme - acoustic guitar
Robbie King - organ (tracks 2,6,7)
William Smith - organ (track 9)
Bobby Taylor - backing vocals

1996 - Wildflower: Golden Classics Edition (Collectibles)

See also
 List of 1970s one-hit wonders in the United States

References

External links
 Skylark on Pacific Northwest Bands
 Wildflower on Nettwerk.ca
 Article at canadianbands.com
 

Capitol Records artists
Musical groups established in 1971
Musical groups disestablished in 1973
Musical groups from Vancouver
Canadian pop rock music groups
1971 establishments in British Columbia
1973 disestablishments in Canada